Luciano Vincenzoni (7 March 1926 – 22 September 2013) was an Italian screenwriter, known as the "script doctor". He wrote for some 65 films between 1954 and 2000.

Biography
Vincenzoni was born in Treviso, Veneto. He is probably best known in world cinema for his scriptwriting of Sergio Leone's For a Few Dollars More (1965) and The Good, the Bad and the Ugly in 1966, but he also wrote for a number of other Spaghetti Westerns.

Filmography
His screenwriting credits also include:
The Wanderers (1956)
 The Italians They Are Crazy (1958)
 Revolt of the Mercenaries (1961)
La vita agra (1964)
Seduced and Abandoned (1964)
The Birds, the Bees and the Italians (1966)
Death Rides a Horse (1967)
The Mercenary (1968)
Duck, You Sucker!, a.k.a. A Fistful of Dynamite (1971)
Orca (1977)
Raw Deal (1986)
Once Upon a Crime (1992)
Malèna (2000)

See also
Sergio Leone
Sacco e Vanzetti (play)

References

External links

Official Blog about the documentary based on Vincenzoni's life titled  THE FALSE LIAR

1926 births
2013 deaths
People from Treviso
Italian screenwriters
Italian male screenwriters